Lunar Palace 1, Moon Palace 1 or Yuegong-1 (Chinese: 月宫1号 or 月宫1 or 月宫一号 or 月宫一 ; pinyin: Yuègōng 1 hào or Yuègōng 1 or Yuègōng Yī hào or Yuègōng Yī) is a Chinese research facility for developing a moon base. It is an environmentally closed facility where occupants can simulate a long-duration self-contained mission with no outside inputs other than power/energy.

Facilities
Lunar Palace 1 occupies a 160m2 500m3 self-contained laboratory in Beijing composed of a 58m2 vegetation area of two cabins, a 42m2 living area with three bedrooms, dining room, bathroom and waste disposal chamber. The lab was designed by Liu Hong of the Beijing University of Aeronautics and Astronautics (BUAA). The lab is a type of bioregenerative life support system (BLSS), the third built in the world and the first in China.

With a crew of three, 55% of the food consumed is to be produced internally, balanced by reserves. The oxygen would be regenerated through the vegetation compartment, and the water is to be recycled internally. The crew's waste was composted.

Construction on the facility began in March 2013. The facility was unveiled on the Chinese New Year (31 January 2014). It was commissioned prior to the first mission starting in February 2014.

Missions

2014 - First research mission 
The first research mission was the Integrative Experimental Facility "Lunar Palace 1" for Permanent Astrobase Life-support Artificial Closed Ecosystem (PALACE) Research (aka "Lunar Palace-1"), a 105-day mission of three researchers. The one man, Dong Chen, and two women, Xie Beizhen and Wang Minjuan, volunteers from the BUAA, conducted the first long-duration research project of this kind in China, 3 February to 20 May 2014.

The crew grew five cereals, including wheat, corn, soybeans, peanuts and lentils; 15 vegetables, including carrots, cucumbers and  water spinach; and one fruit, strawberries. The wheat provided the main source of calories and the primary source of oxygen. Meat was the primary foodstock; however, meat was grown, in the form of yellow mealworms, the crew's primary protein source.

The diet studied was to determine if a space crew could subsist on a high protein diet with vegetables and mealworms. The mealworms, composed of 3/4 protein, were chosen due to a United Nations study recommending them as a food source for the poor and undernourished; however, it was met with resistance from Western astronauts. They have a tendency to escape confinement. Mealworms reached the size of fingers in weeks. The mealworms were fed the leftover and inedible parts of the produce.

The mission's ecological system was to be a testbed for the controlled ecological life support system (CELSS) for the permanent Chinese space station of the China Manned Space Engineering Office (CSME). The BLSS system used on the mission was at the time the most advanced ever fielded.

2017-2018 Second research mission 
For the second mission, two teams of four volunteers spent 370 days in isolation.

See also 

 Bioregenerative life support system (BLSS)
 Biosphere 2, an environmentally cut-off research facility
 BIOS-3
 BioHome
 Biotron
 Chinese Lunar Exploration Program (CLEP)
 Tiangong (Heavenly Palace), Chinese orbital space station program

References

External links
 '"Moon Palace 1" experiment succeeds'  - People's Daily, 2014 May 22 10:19

Controlled ecological life support systems
Artificial ecosystems
Ecological experiments
Human analog missions
Beihang University
Space farming